Metaxmeste cinerealis is a species of moth in the family Crambidae. It is found in Italy.

References

Moths described in 1942
Odontiini
Moths of Europe